Corruption in Lebanon is magnified after the end of the civil war in 1990. It is analysed as a case . Once a taboo subject, now it is at the forefront of the public debate in Lebanon. Anti-corruption sentiment has been one of the driving forces behind many of the large scale Lebanese protests in recent history.

Extent 
Transparency International's 2021 Corruption Perceptions Index (CPI) scored Lebanon at 24 on a scale of 0 to 100, where a score of 0 signals a perception of a very corrupt public sector and 100, a very honest one. When the 180 countries of the 2021 CPI were ranked by score with the highest-scoring countries at the top of the list, Lebanon ranked 149th, among the lowest-scoring countries of the Index.

Government officials reportedly often award contracts to friends and family leading to many of the country's problems like daily power cuts. Many working class Lebanese citizens rely on economic assistance from their party which stops them from speaking up against the system or bring them to justice, despite widespread opposition. Lebanon's government works within the framework of confessionalism, with parliamentary seats and others government positions allocated by religious confession. Many members of government have been in power since the Lebanese Civil War, with a simple shuffling of positions every election cycle. Many blame this system for the country's continued corruption.

Corruption happens on every level of society and is not strictly limited to high level officials. As in many neighboring countries, using personal family and party connections to get favors like skipping a long queue, getting into a selective institution, or finding a job; known locally as wasta; is common practice and has become the social norm. Although many believe that using wasta is understandable for each individual case as institutions are often inefficient without it, it is also agreed upon that the social phenomenon deepens economic inequality.

Public reaction and opposition 
Anti-corruption sentiment has been one of the driving forces behind many of the large scale Lebanese protests in recent history. Notably the 2015–2016 Lebanese protests sparked by the closure of a waste dump without a plan which triggered a "garbage crisis" and the 2019–2020 Lebanese protests sparked by an increase in taxes

Many anti-system parties run on an anti-corruption platforms, most notably Beirut Madinati, which ran during the 2016 Beirut municipal election. Although the party lost, it gained unprecedented traction for an outsider party in Lebanon's otherwise rigid political status quo. With 40% of the votes, it forced the March 14 Alliance and the March 8 Alliance, historical opponents, to form a coalition in order to win

Contaminated fuel scandal 
In July 2020, Lebanese company ZR Energy was indicted, as it had used to import contaminated fuel from Algerian company Sonatrach, which costed $2bn worth of fuel deliveries per year.

Beirut port explosion 
On 4 August 2020, an explosion at the port of Beirut killed at least 190 people, injured more than 6,500, and left an around 300,000 people homeless. The blast was caused by 2,750 tons of ammonium nitrate that had been stored unsafely in a warehouse.

Anti-corruption organizations 
There are some NGO's fighting corruption in Lebanon:
 Lebanese Transparency Association, which is Transparency International's chapter in Lebanon, focuses on curbing corruption and promoting the principles of good governance.
 Sakker El Dekkene: aims to raise public awareness about the dangers of corruption and its high cost to the economy, and to promote a culture of integrity and good governance in Lebanon.
 Junior Chamber International (JCI): a non-profit organization of 200,000 young people, ages 18 to 40, who are in Lebanon.
 The Lebanese Advocacy and Legal Advice Centre (LALAC): an initiative launched by the Lebanese Transparency Association-No Corruption. It aims to inform citizens about their legal rights and encourages victims and witnesses to take action against cases of corruption.

References

Bibliography 
, https://www.anti-corruption.org/wp-content/uploads/2016/11/Corruption-in-reconstruction-TIRI-Adwan.pdf
 Adwan, Charles/Sahyoun, Rabee’, 2001: « Post-war profiteering » in Lebanon: The story of Reconstruction, The Lebanese Transparency Association, 2001, http://www.transparency-lebanon.org/Archives/Post-war%20Profiteering.PDF (Dec. 5, 2006)

Lebanon
Politics of Lebanon